Opposition House is an historic double house in Cambridge, Massachusetts.  The two story hip-roofed wood-frame house was built in 1807 by Judge Francis Dana, who was seeking to prevent the laying of Harvard Street across his estate, making it a kind of spite house.  Dana's efforts were unsuccessful; the road was routed around this house, which he had sited along the intended route.  The house was moved to its present location in the 1860s.  It is the oldest surviving house on Dana Hill.

The house was listed on the National Register of Historic Places in 1982.

See also
National Register of Historic Places listings in Cambridge, Massachusetts

References

Houses on the National Register of Historic Places in Cambridge, Massachusetts
Houses completed in 1807
Federal architecture in Massachusetts
Spite houses